"Héroe Favorito" is a song by American singer Romeo Santos. The song was written by Romeo Santos and Joaquín Díaz, with production handled by Romeo Santos and Matetraxx. It was released to digital retailers on February 10, 2017, through Sony Music Latin, as the lead single released off Santos' third studio album, Golden. The song debuted at number one on Billboards Latin Airplay chart, as well as reached the top 10 in Dominican Republic, Panama and Spain.

Background
Audio of the song was leaked on the internet ahead of its release. On February 10, 2017, the song was released to iTunes Store and Tidal earlier than expected. It was released to all major digital retailers on February 13, 2017.

In an interview with Billboard magazine, Santos said that the song was about "a girl he's infatuated with and wants to be her superhero to protect her". Santos said: "Her parents are trying to set her up with this other guy. At least from my perspective, she's not too enthusiastic about it, so in my imagination, I'm like, if I were a superhero I would protect her. I have strength like Hulk, climb up 100 feet to her balcony like Spider-Man, a lot of metaphors."

Composition
The song is described by Elias Leight of Billboard as an "audacious combination of jazz and bachata".

Artwork
Santos collaborated with Marvel Custom, Marvel Comics' content and marketing agency, on the single's artwork, in which he was dressed up as a superhero. "I always had this fascination with superheroes," Santos told Billboard. "Who didn't love Hulk and Spider-Man?" The outfit was inspired by the Punisher, also a character from Marvel.

"He wanted a dark, Kevlar, Punisher type of thing, but without the weapons," said Darren Sanchez, project manager and editor of Marvel Custom. "He liked the idea of a cape, but he didn't necessarily want a cape, so we went with a trench coat that had the same kind of billowing look. He didn't want it too bulky; wanted to make sure it was a realistic body type. He said he liked darker colors, but he wanted highlights, either gold or silver." Marvel characters generally have a helmet or mask, but "a dark, wraparound eye-mask" was created for Santos. "When it's a celebrity, you don't want to cover his face. Half of Iron Man, his helmet is off." explained Sanchez.

Music video
The music video was released on February 14, 2017, on YouTube through Vevo. It was directed by Marc Klasfeld and shot in Los Angeles, it featured American actress Génesis Rodríguez, who voices Honey Lemon in Disney's 2014 film Big Hero 6 as well as its follow-up television series. The video shows Santos, as a driver, using his superpowers to chase after his love interest, who is his client and ends with him and the woman kissing, mirroring the iconic upside-down kiss from the 2002 film Spider-Man between the titular character and his love interest Mary Jane Watson. Kelsey Garcia of PopSugar called it a "dramatic video". Similarly, Isabelia Herrera of Remezcla regarded it as "a classic Romeo video".

Live performances
On Februeary 23, 2017, Santos performed "Héroe Favorite" live during the 29th Annual Lo Nuestro Awards ceremony where he was honored with the Excellence Award. On April 13, 2017, Santos performed the song at the American late-night talk show Jimmy Kimmel Live!.

Credits and personnel
Credits adapted from Tidal.

 Romeo Santos – composer, lyricist, producer, arranger
 Joaquín Díaz – composer, pianist, arranger
 Iván Chévere a/k/a Matetraxx – producer, mixing engineer, engineer
 Tom Brick – mastering engineer
 Paul Raini Castelluzzo – acoustic guitarist, guitarist
 Dante Rivera – bassist
 Raúl Bier – bongo player
 Enrique Terrero – conga player
 Alexander Caba – guitarist

Charts

Certifications

See also
List of Billboard number-one Latin songs of 2017

References

2017 singles
2017 songs
Romeo Santos songs
Songs written by Romeo Santos
Spanish-language songs
Sony Music Latin singles